In the Beginning may refer to:

Biblical phrase
 "In the beginning" (phrase), a phrase in the Bible verses of Genesis 1:1 and John 1:1

Books
 In the Beginning (novel), a novel by Chaim Potok
 In the Beginning, a 2004 story arc and collected edition in The Punisher comics
 In the Beginning... Was the Command Line, a 1999 long essay by Neal Stephenson
 In the Beginning: B.C. 4004 (In the Garden of Eden), the first play in George Bernard Shaw's Back to Methuselah series

Film, radio and television
 In the Beginning: The Bible Stories, a 1997 anime series created by Osamu Tezuka
 Babylon 5: In the Beginning, a 1998 Babylon 5 TV movie
 The Bible: In the Beginning..., a 1966 epic film recounting the first 22 chapters of the Book of Genesis
 In the Beginning (miniseries), a 2000 TV film starring Martin Landau
 In the Beginning (2009 film), a French drama
 In the Beginning (TV series), a 1978 American sitcom starring McLean Stevenson
 In the Beginning, a New York radio program produced by Larry Josephson

Television episodes 
 "In the Beginning" (All in Good Faith)
 "In the Beginning" (The Brittas Empire)
 "In the Beginning" (Dante's Cove)
 "In the Beginning" (Dexter)
 "In the Beginning" (God, the Devil and Bob)
 "In the Beginning" (The Janice Dickinson Modeling Agency)
 "In the Beginning" (Lavender Castle)
 "In the Beginning" (Legion of Super Heroes)
 "In the Beginning" (Oh, Brother!)
 "In the Beginning" (The Secret Adventures of Jules Verne)
 "In the Beginning" (Superbook)
 "In the Beginning" (Supernatural)
 "In the Beginning" (Swamp Thing)
 "In the Beginning" (Tattooed Teenage Alien Fighters from Beverly Hills)
 "In the Beginning" (True Blood)

Music

Classical
 In the Beginning (Copland), a 1947 choral work by Aaron Copland
 In the Beginning, Priscilla McLean (born 1942)
 In the Beginning, Robert Saxton (born 1953)
 In the Beginning, David Rosenboom (born 1947)
In the Beginning, God, jazz composition by Duke Ellington from Duke Ellington's Sacred Concerts

Albums
 In the Beginning (Circa 1960), a 1970 album by The Beatles and the Beat Brothers with Tony Sheridan
 In the Beginning (Blazin' Squad album), 2002
 In the Beginning (The Byrds album), 1988
 In the Beginning (Cro-Mags album), 2020
 In the Beginning (Genesis album), 1974 reissue title of the 1969 album From Genesis to Revelation
 In the Beginning (Isaac Hayes album), 1972 reissue title of the 1968 album Presenting Isaac Hayes
 In the Beginning (Journey album), 1979
 In the Beginning (Hubert Laws album), 1974
 In the Beginning (Madonna album) or Pre-Madonna, a 1997 unauthorized album
 In the Beginning (Nile album), 2000
 In the Beginning 1963–1964, a 2012 album by Pharoah Sanders
 In the Beginning – The 1981 Singles, a 1986 EP by Play Dead
 In the Beginning (Stevie Ray Vaughan album), 1992
 In the Beginning (Triumph album), 1995 reissue title of the 1976 album Triumph
 In the Beginning (Woody Shaw album), 1983
 In the Beginning: The World of Aretha Franklin 1960–1967, an album by Aretha Franklin
 In the Beginning by Roy Buchanan, 1974
 In the Beginning, a compilation of recordings by Hawkwind also released on The Text of Festival, 1985
 In the Beginning, by Lonnie Smith, 2013
 In the Beginning, by Salem (UK band), 2010
 In the Beginning, an EP by Kate Stewart, 2018
 In the Beginning, by The Slits

Songs
 "In the Beginning" (1954 song), by Frankie Laine
 "In the Beginning" (The Moody Blues song), 1969
 "In the Beginning", by Amorphis from Tales from the Thousand Lakes
 "In the Beginning", by E.Y.C.
 "In the Beginning", by Genesis from From Genesis to Revelation
 "In the Beginning", by K'Naan from The Dusty Foot Philosopher
 "In the Beginning", by Mötley Crüe from Shout at the Devil
 "In the Beginning", by Stephen Schwartz from the musical Children of Eden
 "In the Beginning", by The Stills from Without Feathers
 "In the Beginning", a 2019 song by Australian drill rap group Onefour

See also
 Begin (disambiguation)
 Beginning (disambiguation)
 The Beginning (disambiguation)